Lloyd Alexander A. Everitt (born 20 March 1987) is a Welsh actor. In 2015 at 27, he was the youngest actor to play Othello at Shakespeare's Globe. He was nominated for Best Newcomer at the National Television Awards for his role in the BBC One medical drama Casualty (2016–2017).

Early life
Everitt is from Barry in the Vale of Glamorgan. He was born to Jamaican mother Pauline and Welsh father Haydn, and he has a sister. He attended Gladstone Primary School and Barry Boys' School. He graduated from the Royal Welsh College of Music & Drama in 2010. Everitt was diagnosed with dyslexia while at drama school, where he was taught to use illustrations to help him learn lines. He is an ambassador for the British Dyslexia Association.

Filmography

Film

Television

Stage

Audio

Awards and nominations

Notes

References

External links
 
 Lloyd Everitt at Independent Talent

Living people
1987 births
21st-century Welsh male actors
Actors with dyslexia
Alumni of the Royal Welsh College of Music & Drama
Black British male actors
People from Barry, Vale of Glamorgan
Welsh male Shakespearean actors
Welsh people of Jamaican descent
Year of birth uncertain